Buck Rogers XXVC (sometimes written as Buck Rogers in the 25th Century) is a game setting created by TSR, Inc. in the late 1980s.  Products based on this setting include novels, graphic novels, a role-playing game (RPG), board game, and video games.  The setting was active from 1988 until 1995.

History
Buck Rogers is a fictional character created in 1928 by Philip Francis Nowlan. A Buck Rogers comic strip written by Nowlan was syndicated by John F. Dille (who may have contributed the nickname "Buck" to the character). Ownership of Buck Rogers and other works passed into the hands of the Dille Family Trust.

In the 1980s, John Dille's granddaughter, Lorraine Williams, was the president of TSR.  In that decade, business for TSR was booming, mainly as a result of their popular RPG, Advanced Dungeons & Dragons.  Lorraine Williams decided to merge Buck Rogers and D&D to make the XXVc game setting. First, a board game came out in 1988, later followed by a role-playing game in 1990. The latter was based on the Advanced Dungeons & Dragons Second Edition rules, but there are some small differences. It was a new incarnation of the Buck Rogers world created by Williams' brother, Flint Dille. Its universe was limited to the Solar System, and revolved heavily around interplanetary travel and terraforming. A few dozen expansion modules were published, as well as a line of novels and graphic novels.

The company TSR owned Advanced Dungeons & Dragons at the time and had worked with SSI on a computerized version of the rules. SSI developed their "Gold Box" game engine for Advanced Dungeons & Dragons, so it was natural for them to use the engine for the XXVc rules.

Setting

History

The setting of XXVC is a possible future of the real universe that we live in.  In the year 1999, the Soviet Union and the United States are involved in the "Last Gasp War."  This is the world's first nuclear war.

This war causes many governments of Earth to abandon conventional warfare and embrace large alliances.  Three of these alliances that grow to be superpowers are the Russo-American Mercantile ("RAM"), the Indo-Asian Consortium ("IAC"), and the Euro-Bloc Faction ("EBF").  In the latter half of the 21st century, these three alliances jointly form the System States Alliance ("SSA") for the purposes of exploring and colonizing the Solar System.  Slowly, the SSA begins to terraform the inner planets.  Mars is colonized by RAM, Luna is colonized by EBF, and Venus is controlled by IAC.

The main method of interplanetary travel from this time onward is the rocket ship.  These vessels use fusion reactions to power the ship throughout its entire voyage.  Rocket ships usually can range from 5 to 500 tons.

In the year 2275, RAM revolts against Earth and gains independence.  Furthermore, because of Earth's dependence on the other planets for resources, RAM begins to dominate Earth.  In 2310, refugees from Earth begin to colonize Mercury.  In the next century, the asteroid belt and Jupiter begin to be settled. Human DNA is modified with genes from various animals, resulting in genetically modified humans commonly known as "gennies." These play a role in the settlement of Venus, Mars, Jupiter and also of many asteroids and moons.

In the first half of the 25th century, certain Terrans (inhabitants of Earth) form the New Earth Organization ("NEO").  This society plans to rebel against the rule of RAM and restore Earth to its former glory.  After the revival of Buck Rogers, NEO is strengthened by alliances with other governments and space pirates.  NEO is able to repel the occupation by RAM and fend off the ensuing large-scale attack by RAM.

Most of the XXVC material takes place in the time from 2430 until 2460.

Buck Rogers
Like all other versions of the Buck Rogers universe, one central story is that of Anthony "Buck" Rogers.  In this case, Buck is the pilot of an experimental spacecraft for the American government in 1999. Buck is sent into space to destroy "MasterLink" - a heavily defended satellite that acts as the hub of the Soviet war machine. The MasterLink satellite is primarily controlled by an eponymous artificial intelligence, but as an experimental system, it is supplemented by a Soviet cosmonaut named "Karkov" - who coincidentally murdered Rogers' parents years before while they were flying in a commercial jet the Soviet Union declared a spy craft.

The battle ends badly for both combatants; the Masterlink satellite is neutralized (but not destroyed), and Karkov dies from space exposure. Masterlink integrates Karkov's mind into its program before he dies. Rogers survives the battle, but his own ship has taken too much damage to make atmospheric reentry. Instead, he utilizes an experimental cryogenic system to await recovery. However, the "Last Gasp War" begins before a rescue can be attempted, and his preserved form is left drifting in space for the next five centuries.

In the year 2456, Rogers's spacecraft is discovered, and a number of factions race to recover it for various unrelated reasons. He is ultimately recovered by a civilian researcher who brings him out of cryogenic stasis, resurrecting the 20th century hero. Rogers, upon discovering what Earth has suffered in his absence, joins NEO, a resistance movement fighting to liberate Earth from its absentee landlord, RAM. His expertise, dedication and symbolic value ultimately prove to be the key to NEO's defeat of RAM.

Planets and other bodies
Mercury was colonized by refugees from Earth after the revolt of RAM.  There are three main groups of people on Mercury.  The "Sun Kings" build giant mariposas to harvest light from the Sun.  They then resell this energy to other planets and deliver the energy by RF beams.  Miners occupy underground warrens where they excavate metals from the planet.  Others occupy "track cities," large vehicles that travel the surface of the planet and stay precisely on the terminator to keep the temperature bearable.
Venus was settled early on by the IAC.  There are a few factions of Venusians on the planet. Its dominant faction, the Ishtarians, is of Asian descent and formed a religious society. The people of Aphrodite are organised in merchant clans. Both live on major plateaus rising above the planet's surface, where regular human life is impossible due to environmental extremes and acid rains. This is where the Lowlanders dwell, humanoids with reptilian features. For a major portion of its history, Venus had a peace treaty with Mars. This was a major reason that RAM was able to conquer Earth. 
Earth is populated by the Terrans, or natives of Earth.  The condition of Earth is very bad compared to the other inner planets.  Due to centuries of exploitation by RAM, many natural resources are spent, cities are demolished, and hopes are crushed. Advanced technology is confined to independent arcologies, but also several communities try to reestablish a more civilized order as well - the so-called "orgs" like Los Angelorg, Chicagorg, etc. In orbit around Earth are many satellites, especially at the Lagrange points of Luna's orbit; these L-5 colonies are teeming slums.
Luna, or Earth's Moon, was settled by the EBF.  They deal extensively with interplanetary banking and trade.  The Lunarians are staunchly neutral.  They defend this position with large mass drivers mounted on the surface of the Moon.
Mars was settled by RAM as the first colonization of another planet by humans.  Mars is a center of trade and industry for the entire Solar System.  RAM has such tight control over the workings of the planet that the names "RAM" and "Mars" are used almost interchangeably.  RAM wields power throughout the whole solar system, as demonstrated by their financial investments, military presence, and political clout on almost all the other planets and bodies.
The Asteroid Belt is a loosely organized collection of settlements. Their inhabitants are commonly known as "Belters." The belt contains space ports and cities that deal in mining, trade, and certain illegal business.  The asteroid belt is the home of the Black Brotherhood.
Jupiter is already a remote location in the outer Solar System. Since it is a gas giant, it is unable to be terraformed by existing methods. A race of extremely genetically modified humanoids, the Stormriders, inhabit its outer atmosphere in floating cities. The large number of Jovian moons make it a good site for industry, crime, and secret bases of all sorts.
Saturn is similar to Jupiter in all respects, except that its outer atmosphere is uninhabited. All activity in the Saturnian system is focused on its moons, and also somewhat on the rings.
Uranus hosts a remote outpost.
Pluto and Charon are uninhabited in the conventional sense.  Existing there, however, is a colony of nanotechnical organisms evolved from an early Earth-based experiment.  These organisms eventually invade the inner planets but are stopped through cooperation of the normally opposed forces of the inner planets.

Organizations
The Russo-American Mercantile, or "RAM", occupies Mars, and is the largest superpower in the solar system.  In the 25th century, RAM is headed by Simund Holzerhein, a very wealthy Martian who was rich enough to afford the process of downloading his consciousness into a computer, turning him into a "digital personality."  From within the central computers of RAM, Holzerhein can rule with the benefits of the information around him. Those within RAM are either born into a high position or have worked up from the bottom to no higher than middle management.  Though most RAM employees consider themselves to be good, much of the solar system considers the organization to be corrupt and evil. Notable members of RAM are the above-mentioned Simund Holzerhein, his niece Ardala Valmar, and 'Killer' Kane.
The New Earth Organization, or "NEO", seeks to rebuild Earth and return order and prosperity to it.  Until it was conquered by RAM, Earth was the dominant planet in the solar system.  It is this former glory that drives NEO. Most NEO members use nicknames recalling the former glory of Earth, such as Beowulf or Washington. NEO uses as its headquarters a secret base, Salvation III Station. Salvation is hidden inside a junkyard satellite in a Lagrange point in orbit around Earth. Some notable members of NEO are Buck Rogers, Beowulf (the leader of NEO), Wilma Deering, Elias Huer, now an AI called HuerDOS (cf. McCoy Pauley from Neuromancer), and Carlton Turabian (who runs Salvation Station).
The Black Brotherhood is a band of space pirates that raids vessels throughout the solar system. They call the asteroid belt their home. During the 25th century, Black Barney is the Brotherhood's leader.

Computer games
These two games were developed and published by SSI for various platforms and are entirely unrelated to Sega's 1982 Buck Rogers video game Buck Rogers: Planet of Zoom.
 Buck Rogers XXVc SF Computer RPG, Volume I: Countdown to Doomsday (Sep 1990, 16685-04135; Amiga, Commodore 64, MS-DOS, Sega Genesis.) 
 Buck Rogers XXVc SF Computer RPG, Volume II: Matrix Cubed (Jan 1992, 16685-04154; MS-DOS.)

Board games
The Buck Rogers Battle for the XXVth Century board game (TSR, Jun 1988) was a strategy game, designed by Jeff Grub, similar to Axis and Allies or Risk. Players maneuvered soldiers, ships, and gennies on a board representing the solar system. During the game, the planets moved, changing the relative distances of the various planets and their moons. In the advanced game, each player's leader character, based on a personage from the setting, had a unique special ability, and the gennies could be assigned special abilities based on their home planet.

Following lackluster response, TSR decided to try again with a more conventional table-top RPG, this time based on the original 1928 Philip Francis Nowlan novel Armageddon, 2419 A.D. (Ace, Aug 1978) and subsequent 1929 comic strip continuity, in which resurgent tribal Americans overthrow their Red Mongol conquerors. The basic game was called the High Adventure Cliffhangers Buck Rogers Adventure Game (Sep 1993) and was co-designed by Jeff Grubb and Steven Schend. The High Adventure Cliffhangers Buck Rogers War Against The Han Campaign Supplement (Dec 1993) was designed by Steven Schend alone. Although published by TSR as a licensed Buck Rogers property, this game is unconnected with the XXVC universe.

Bibliography

Gaming supplements

Novels

There were 10 novels published under the XXVC banner, including three trilogies.

 
The Martian Wars Trilogy:
 
 
 
The Inner Planets Trilogy:
 
 
 
The Invaders of Charon Trilogy:

References

External links
 
Zarn's Domain: Buck Rogers XXVc

Fiction about the Solar System
TSR, Inc. games
Role-playing games introduced in 1988
Space opera role-playing games
Buck Rogers